was a Japanese  poet and novelist. He was born in Dalian, China, while it was Japan's leased territory, spent his youth there, and is noted for his stories about the life in Dalian. He received the Akutagawa Prize in 1969, for his story, Dalian of Acasia Flowers.

He was married to Keiko Iwasaka.

Major works
 Frozen Frames (氷った焔, Kōtta honō, 1959)  
 Dalian of Acasia Flowers (1969) 
 Sakharov's Fantasy (サハロフの幻想, Sakharov no genbō, 1969)

References 

1922 births
2006 deaths
20th-century Japanese novelists
21st-century Japanese novelists
Japanese literary critics
20th-century Japanese poets
Japanese expatriates in China